Free economy may refer to:

 Freiwirtschaft
 Market economy
 Calculation in kind, also known as a money-free economy